Ollie Charles Thomas (born November 7, 1899) was an American college football player and coach. He served as the head football coach at the South Dakota School of Mines in Rapid City, South Dakota from 1924 to 1928.

References

1899 births
Year of death missing
Emporia State Hornets football players
South Dakota Mines Hardrockers football coaches
People from Buchanan County, Missouri